The Otter Lake Community Church, built in 1861 in Hawkinsville, New York, is now located on the east side of Route 28 in Otter Lake, Oneida County, New York. It was moved to this site in 1921.

This Gothic Revival-style church has the following architectural features: emphasis on verticality; board and batten siding; steeply pitched roof; and arched windows and door. The interior of the church contains the original pews, altar, and balcony.  It is a rectangular, gable roofed Carpenter Gothic structure with board-and-batten siding.  It features a massive four stage, square tower engaged in the front facade. Located on the south side of the church is the pastor's lodge, erected in 1924.

It was listed on the National Register of Historic Places in 2004.

The AARCH Award 2004 was awarded to the trustees of the Otter Lake Community Church for long-term stewardship.

References

Churches on the National Register of Historic Places in New York (state)
Carpenter Gothic church buildings in New York (state)
Churches completed in 1861
Churches in Oneida County, New York
National Register of Historic Places in Oneida County, New York
1861 establishments in New York (state)